Coley McCabe is an American country music singer. In 2000, she signed to RCA Records Nashville and released two singles. The first of these, "Grow Young with You" (a duet with labelmate Andy Griggs), was also included in the soundtrack to the 2000 film Where the Heart Is. A second single entitled "Who I Am to You" followed, but McCabe never released an album. She also co-wrote SHeDAISY's 2001 single "Lucky 4 You (Tonight I'm Just Me)."

Discography

Singles

Music videos

References

American country singer-songwriters
American women country singers
Singer-songwriters from Pennsylvania
RCA Records Nashville artists
Year of birth missing (living people)
Living people
People from Fulton County, Pennsylvania
Country musicians from Pennsylvania
21st-century American women